David Elbaz is a French novelist and observational astrophysicist, specializing in galaxy formation and evolution. He has been a researcher at the Astrophysics Division (AIM) of the Commissariat à l'Énergie Atomique et aux Énergies Alternatives (CEA-Saclay) since 1994, where he is currently the Director of Research. He was in charge of directing the "Cosmology and Evolution of Galaxies" laboratory at AIM/CEA-Saclay for about a decade. He has also worked as the scientific advisor to the European Space Agency for the selection of its future space missions (Astronomy Working Group) and was a member of the evaluation committee on space research and exploration for the Centre National d'Etudes Spatiales (CNES) in France.

Biography
Elbaz's grandparents moved to France from Morocco at the beginning of the 20th century. He was born and raised in the Paris Métro area. He repeated a school year twice in high school. He also attended the École Nationale Supérieure de Physique (ENSPG) in Grenoble, where he obtained his undergraduate degree as an Engineer in 1990. He completed his PhD in Astrophysics in 1994 at the Université Joseph Fourier in Grenoble with a thesis entitled "Origine du fer dans le milieu intra-amas et distribution du gaz X dans les amas de galaxies". His supervisors were James Lequeux and Monique Arnaud.  In 2005, he was awarded his habilitation from the University of Paris XI.

Elbaz has supervised 14 postdoctoral researchers and 7 PhD students, two of whom received awards for their dissertations: H. Aussel (1999) and C. Schreiber (2015). Since 2005 he has taught the "Galaxy Evolution" course in the Master program, "Recherche Astronomie, Astrophysique et Ingénierie Spatiale de Paris".

Research areas
Elbaz has made contributions in observational extragalactic astrophysics using mostly space infrared and submillimeter observations. He has been recognized as an ISI Highly Cited researcher by Clarivate Analytics. In 2001, using new data from the Infrared Space Observatory, Elbaz and Ranga Chary produced a suite of galaxy spectral energy distribution templates. Along with the current knowledge of the galaxy redshift distribution, they were able to interpret the cosmic infrared background as being produced to at least 70% level from dust enshrouded star formation in luminous infrared galaxies.). The advent of the Spitzer Space Telescope in 2003 enabled extremely deep observations in mid-infrared. Elbaz and his collaborations analyzed observations from the Great Observatories Origins Deep Survey and demonstrated that the star formation rate of individual galaxies increases due to environmental effects up to a critical galaxy density at redshift one, above which it decreases again, suggesting that galaxy evolution is not independent from structure formation at larger scales in the universe.). Five years later, using deep far infrared observations from the Herschel Space Observatory, Elbaz led a study that revealed that most galaxies across cosmic time form stars in two main modes: one placing them in the "main sequence", where their star formation rate correlates tightly with their stellar mass, and the other where the galaxies are more compact and form stars more efficiently departing from this correlation.). More recently, using observations from ALMA, his group discovered a dominant population of optically invisible massive galaxies in the early Universe.

Awards
Elbaz has received several noteworthy awards, including:
 Chrétien Award of the American Astronomical Society  (2000)
Prix Jaffé from the Foundation of the Institut de France (2017)
 Member of the Academia Europaea (2019)

Administration and service
Elbaz's contributions to the international astrophysics' community include:
 Managing Editor of Astronomy & Astrophysics Journal, 2018–present
 Member of the ESA SPICA Science Team, 2018–2021
 Member of the Euclid France steering committee, 2013–present 
 Member of the ESA Astronomy Working Group, 2015–2018
 President of the International Space Advisory Board for the SPICA satellite for JAXA, 2015–2016

Public outreach
Elbaz is active in public outreach activities and has been interviewed regularly on various topics of modern astrophysics by French media, including "Le Monde", "France Culture", "Sciences et Avenir", and "France Inter". Among his presentations are "Is the Universe an illusion?" (French: L’Univers est-il une illusion), "Do we live in a black hole?" (French: Habitons-nous dans un trou noir ?) and "In search of the killer of galaxies" (French: A la recherche du tueur de galaxies) that was presented at the Conférence Cyclope in February 2020.

Elbaz has written the scenario and participated in shows that involve science and art that have been presented in various theatres in France., including:
 "La tête dans les étoiles" (with the neurobiologist Alain Destexhe and the magician Marc Feld)
 "Magicosmologie" (with Marc Feld)
 "Jonglerie Astrale" (with the juggler Vincent de Lavenère)

Publications
Elbaz has published extensively in various areas of extragalactic observational astrophysics. He has been recognised as an ISI Highly Cited researcher by Clarivate Analytics.

Elbaz has also authored three books:
 "A la recherche de l'univers invisible: matière noire, énergie sombre, trous noirs", 2016, éditions Odile Jacob that popularises science and received  also received in 2017 the "Prix Sciences et Philosophie" in 2017. 
"Αναζητώντας το αόρατο σύμπαν: σκοτεινή ύλη, σκοτεινή ενέργεια, μαύρες τρύπες", 2021, Crete University Press 
 "Le vase de Pépi", 2007, éditions Odile Jacob.
 "...et Alice Tao se souvint du futur", 2010, éditions Odile Jacob.
"La plus belle ruse de la lumière", 2021, éditions Odile Jacob

References

External links
David Elbaz - Astrophysicien - YouTube channel

1966 births
Living people
French astrophysicists
French Alternative Energies and Atomic Energy Commission
Members of Academia Europaea
Scientists from Paris